Cercyonis is a genus of butterflies of the subfamily Satyrinae in the family Nymphalidae found in North America. They are commonly called wood-nymphs or wood nymphs.

Species

Listed alphabetically:
Cercyonis pegala (Fabricius, 1775) – common wood-nymph or large wood-nymph
Cercyonis meadii (Edwards, 1872) – red-eyed wood-nymph or Mead's wood-nymph
Cercyonis sthenele (Boisduval, 1852) – Great Basin wood-nymph 
Cercyonis oetus (Boisduval, 1869) – dark wood-nymph or small wood-nymph

References

 Brock, J.P and Kaufman K. (2003) Kaufman Guide to Butterflies of North America, New York: Houghton Mifflin.

 
Satyrini
Butterfly genera
Taxa named by Samuel Hubbard Scudder